El Cajón Dam is a dam in Capilla del Monte, Córdoba, Argentina.

The construction of El Cajón Dam started in the 1970s but the dam was finally finished and inaugurated in 1993. It is made of concrete and lies on granite terrain. The dam is used as a reservoir of fresh water, to regulate the flow of the river, for fishing (carp and silverside), sailing, canoeing, and windsurfing. The dam cost a total of approximately USD 800 million to construct.

References 

Dams in Argentina
Buildings and structures in Córdoba Province, Argentina
Geography of Córdoba Province, Argentina
Dams completed in 1993